Annika Norlin (born 22 November 1977), of Östersund, Sweden, is a Swedish pop artist, journalist and author who makes music under the names Hello Saferide (in English) and Säkert! (in Swedish).

She released her first book, "Texter" ("Lyrics"),  in 2014, which was a collection of her lyrics - both Swedish and English - for every song she had released so far, and to a few previously unreleased songs.

She released her second book - "Jag ser allt du gör" ("I see everything you do") - in 2020. The book is a collection of eight short stories written by Norlin.

Discography

Hello Saferide
Albums
2005 – Introducing...Hello Saferide
2006 – Introducing...Hello Saferide – vinyl with The Quiz as a bonus track
2008 – More Modern Short Stories From Hello Saferide
2014 – The Hunter, The Fox And Hello Saferide

EP
2006 – Long Lost Penpal EP
2006 – Would You Let Me Play This EP 10 Times A Day?

CDs
2005 – My Best Friend
2005 – If I Don't Write This Song Someone I Love Will Die
2007 – I Was Definitely Made For These Times / The Quiz
2008 – Anna
2009 – Arjeplog

Part of collection
2004 – Jeans & Summer 2, track 5, Highschool Stalker
2006 – Oh No It's Christmas Vol. 1, track 2 iPod X-mas
2008 – There's A Razzia Going On, track 1, I Was Definitely Made For These Times
2009 – There's A Razzia Going On vol. 2, track 1, I Fold

Säkert!
Albums
2007 – Säkert!
2010 – Facit
2011 – På engelska
2017 – Däggdjur

EPs
2017 – Inte jag heller
2018 – Arktiska oceanen

CDs
2007 – Vi kommer att dö samtidigt
2007 – Allt som är ditt
2008 – Det kommer bara leda till nåt
2010 – Fredrik
2010 – Dansa, fastän

Part of collection
2007 – Poem Ballader Och Lite Blues/Återbesöket, spår 2 Generalens visa 
2008 – There's A Razzia Going On vol 1, spår 8 3 Månader sen idag
2009 – Retur Waxholm, spår 3 Jag vill inte suddas ut
2009 – There's A Razzia Going On vol 2, spår 10 Min Hemstad

Annika Norlin
2022 - Mentor

Other collaborations
2006 – Färjemansleden (with Annika Norlin), "Vapnet", from their CD Jag vet hur man väntar
2016 – Garmarna (with Annika Norlin), "Ingen" from the album 6
2019 – CORRESPONDENCE, collaboration with Jens Lekman

Bibliography
 Texter ("Lyrics"), Teg Publishing, Luleå 2014, .
 Jag ser allt du gör ("I see everything you do"), Weyler förlag, Stockholm 2020, .

References 

1977 births
Living people
21st-century Swedish singers
21st-century Swedish women singers
Musikförläggarnas pris winners